Blow-up (sometimes styled as Blowup or Blow Up) is a 1966 mystery drama thriller film directed by Michelangelo Antonioni and produced by Carlo Ponti. It was Antonioni's first entirely English-language film, and stars David Hemmings alongside Vanessa Redgrave and Sarah Miles. Also featured is 1960s model Veruschka. The film's plot was inspired by Julio Cortázar's short story "Las babas del diablo" (1959). 

The story is set within the mod subculture of 1960s Swinging London, and follows a fashion photographer (Hemmings) who believes he has unwittingly captured a murder on film. The screenplay was by Antonioni and Tonino Guerra, with English dialogue by British playwright Edward Bond. The cinematographer was Carlo di Palma. The film's non-diegetic music was scored by jazz pianist Herbie Hancock, while rock group the Yardbirds also feature.

In the main competition section of the Cannes Film Festival, Blowup won the Palme d'Or, the festival's highest honour. The American release of the counterculture-era film with its explicit sexual content was in direct defiance of Hollywood's Production Code. Its subsequent critical and box-office success influenced the abandonment of the code in 1968 in favour of the MPAA film rating system.

Blowup would inspire subsequent films, including Francis Ford Coppola's The Conversation (1974) and Brian De Palma's Blow Out (1981). In 2012, Blowup was ranked No. 144 in the Sight & Sound critics' poll of the world's greatest films.

Plot 
After spending the night at a doss house, where he has taken pictures for a book of art photos, photographer Thomas is late for a photo shoot with model Veruschka at his studio, which in turn makes him late for a shoot with other models later in the morning. He grows bored and walks off, leaving the models and production staff in the lurch. As he departs the studio, two teenaged girls who are aspiring models ask to speak to him, but Thomas drives off to visit at an antique shop.

Wandering into Maryon Park, Thomas takes photos of two lovers. The woman, Jane, is furious at being photographed, and pursues Thomas, demands his film, and ultimately tries to snatch his camera. He refuses and photographs her as she runs away through a meadow. Thomas then meets his agent Ron for lunch, and notices a man following him and looking into his car. Back at his studio, Jane arrives, asking desperately for the film. She and Thomas have a conversation and flirt, but he deliberately hands her a different film roll. She, in turn, writes down a false telephone number and gives it to him.

Thomas, curious, makes multiple zooms of the black-and-white film of Jane and her lover. They reveal Jane worriedly looking at a third person lurking in the trees with a pistol. Thomas excitedly calls Ron, claiming his impromptu photo session may have saved a man's life. Thomas is disturbed by a knock on the door, and it is the two girls again, with whom he has a romp in his studio and falls asleep. Awakening, he finds they hope he will photograph them, but he realizes there may be more to the photographs in the park. He tells them to leave, saying, "Tomorrow! Tomorrow!"

Further examination of a blurred figure under a bush makes Thomas suspect the man in the park may have been murdered after all, during the time Thomas was arguing with the woman around the bend.

As evening falls, the photographer goes back to the park and finds the body of the man, but he has not brought his camera and is scared off by the sound of a twig breaking, as if being stepped on. Thomas returns to find his studio ransacked. All the negatives and prints are gone except for one very grainy blowup of what is possibly the body.

After driving into town, he sees the woman and follows her into a club where The Yardbirds, featuring both Jimmy Page and Jeff Beck on guitar and Keith Relf on vocals, are seen performing the song "Stroll On".  A buzz in Beck's amplifier angers him so much, he smashes his guitar on stage, then throws its neck into the crowd. A riot ensues. The photographer grabs the neck and runs out of the club before anyone can snatch it from him. Then, he has second thoughts about it, throws it on the pavement, and walks away. A passer-by picks up the neck and throws it back down, not realizing it is from Beck's guitar. Thomas never locates the elusive woman.

At a drug-drenched party in a house on the Thames near central London, the photographer finds Veruschka, who had told him that she was going to Paris; when confronted, she says she is in Paris. Thomas asks Ron to come to the park as a witness, but cannot convince him of what has happened because Ron is incredibly stoned. Instead, Thomas joins the party and wakes up in the house at sunrise. He returns to the park alone, only to find that the body is gone.

Befuddled, Thomas watches a mime troupe perform a tennis match, is drawn to it, after a bit picks up the imaginary ball and throws it back to the two players. As he watches the mime, the sound of the ball being played is heard and his image fades away, leaving only the grass as the film ends.

Cast

Themes

Antonioni's screenplay for Blowup forms a "thriller-suspense" revolving around the efforts of a young and successful fashion photographer in his struggle to determine if a series of snapshots he takes at a public park contain evidence of a murder. As Thomas persists in his role as amateur detective, his quest leads him initially to question his technical mastery over the "hidden truth" recorded by his camera, then toward a confrontation with the realities of his life—a life of "material advantages, gained at the expense of ideals." Finally, the conflicted young man questions the reality of his own existence. Film historian Gordan Gow identifies the object in Antonioni's use of suspense: 
 

In an interview at the time of the film's release, Antonioni stated that the film "is not about man's relationship with man, it is about man's relationship with reality". Indeed, Gow observes that “a mystery without a solution is instrumental to the theme of disorientation in Antonioni’s Blowup.

The theme of uncertainty is sustained until the final moments of the Blowup, when Thomas attempts to resolve the contradictions and ambiguities that arise from his investigations and from his own life, but fails to integrate them.

In Blowup’s final sequence, a “garishly attired” mime troupe arrives at the park—escapees from the real world. Thomas joins them in their fantasy play, and like the non-existent ball he “sees” during the troupes’ faux match, he dissolves from view: “As a creature of the factual world, he no longer exists.”

When Blowup’s denouement is reached Thomas’ fate is known and the audience's suspense is resolved, but Antonioni leaves the meaning of the film open to speculation.
Gordon Gow considers alternate interpretations for the film's ending:

Production

Inspirations and Influences
The plot of Blowup was inspired by Julio Cortázar's short story "Las babas del diablo" (1959), collected in the book End of the Game and Other Stories, in turn based on a story told to Cortázar by photographer Sergio Larraín. Subsequently, the short story was retitled "Blow Up" to connect it with the film. The life of Swinging London photographer David Bailey was also an influence.

Casting
Several people were offered the role of the protagonist, including Sean Connery, who declined when Antonioni refused to show him the script, the photographer David Bailey, and Terence Stamp, who was replaced shortly before filming began after Antonioni found David Hemmings in a stage production of Dylan Thomas's Adventures in the Skin Trade.

Filming

The opening mimes were filmed on the Plaza of The Economist Building in St. James's Street, London, a project by 'New Brutalists' Alison and Peter Smithson constructed between 1959 and 1964. The park scenes were at Maryon Park, Charlton, south-east London, and the park has changed little since the film, despite Antonioni painting the grass green to meet his requirements. Photographer John Cowan leased his studio at 39 Princes Place to Antonioni for much of the interior and exterior filming, and Cowan's own photographic murals are featured in the film. Other locations included Heddon Street where the album cover of David Bowie's Ziggy Stardust was later photographed, and Cheyne Walk, in Chelsea.

The rock club scene featuring the Yardbirds performing "Stroll On" – a modified version of "Train Kept A-Rollin'" – was filmed at Elstree Studios, from 12 to 14 October 1966. Also in the rock club scene English broadcaster, journalist, writer Janet Street-Porter appears as a dancing extra in a silver coat and red/yellow striped trousers.

Actor Ronan O'Casey claimed that the film's mysterious nature is the product of an "unfinished" production. In a 1999 letter to Roger Ebert, O'Casey wrote that scenes which would have "depict[ed] the planning of the murder and its aftermath – scenes with Vanessa, Sarah Miles and Jeremy Glover, Vanessa's new young lover who plots with her to murder me – were never shot because the film went seriously over budget." O'Casey had previously told this story to Der Spiegel in 1967, where he stated that Dyson Lovell played the part of the murderous lover. Two scenes in particular give credence to this theory: the first in the restaurant when the new lover's character (played by Lovell) is seen apparently tampering with Thomas' car, and the second when Glover and Redgrave are glimpsed together in a Rover 2000 (which also appears elsewhere) following Thomas' Rolls-Royce.

Thomas drives a rare Rolls-Royce Silver Cloud III 'Chinese Eye' Mulliner Park Ward Drophead Coupé owned by DJ and Television presenter Jimmy Savile. It was originally painted white and painted black by the production. Only approximately 100 coach built Silver Clouds IIIs were made with the unique slanted headlights, and it remains an iconic element of the film.

Release 
MGM did not gain approval for the film under the MPAA's Production Code in the United States. The film was condemned by the National Legion of Decency. The code's collapse and revision was foreshadowed when MGM released the film through a subsidiary distributor, Premier Productions, and Blowup was shown widely in North American cinemas.

Box office
Writing about Antonioni for Time in 2007, the film writer Richard Corliss stated that the film grossed $20 million (about $ million in ) on a $1.8 million budget and "helped liberate Hollywood from its puritanical prurience."

The film earned $5.9 million (about $ in ) in theatrical rentals in the United States and Canada in 1967.

Critical reception

Film critic Andrew Sarris said the movie was "a mod masterpiece". In Playboy magazine, film critic Arthur Knight wrote that Blowup would be "as important and seminal a film as Citizen Kane, Open City and Hiroshima, Mon Amour – perhaps even more so". Time magazine called the film a "far-out, uptight and vibrantly exciting picture" that represented a "screeching change of creative direction" for Antonioni; the magazine predicted it would "undoubtedly be by far the most popular movie Antonioni has ever made".

Bosley Crowther, film critic of The New York Times, called it a "fascinating picture," but expressed reservations, describing the "usual Antonioni passages of seemingly endless wanderings" as "redundant and long"; nevertheless, he called Blowup a "stunning picture – beautifully built up with glowing images and color compositions that get us into the feelings of our man and into the characteristics of the mod world in which he dwells". Even film director Ingmar Bergman, who generally disliked Antonioni, called the film a masterpiece.

Anthony Quinn, writing for The Guardian, described Blowup as "a picture about perception and ambiguity," suggesting an association between elements of the film and the Zapruder film of the 1963 Kennedy assassination.

According to author Thomas Beltzer, the film explores the "inherently alienating" qualities of our media, where "the camera has turned us into passive voyeurs, programmable for predictable responses, ultimately helpless and even inhumanly dead". Bilge Eberi of Houston Press notes the contrast between "the sinewy movements of the girls, their psychedelic jumpsuits and slinky dresses and multicolored minis," and "the blurred, frozen, inchoate unknowability of the death contained within his image," explaining that the photo "is a glimpse of the eternal and elemental – the dead body and the gun are both in the bushes, almost like a natural fact – that completely reorders, or rather disorders, Thomas' world. As an artist, he can't capture it or understand it or do anything with it. As an individual, he can't possess it or consume it."

Roger Ebert described the film as "a hypnotic conjuring act, in which a character is awakened briefly from a deep sleep of bored alienation and then drifts away again. This is the arc of the film. Not 'Swinging London.' Not existential mystery. Not the parallels between what Hemmings does with his photos and what Antonioni does with Hemmings. But simply the observations that we are happy when we are doing what we do well, and unhappy seeking pleasure elsewhere. I imagine Antonioni was happy when he was making this film." In his commentary for the DVD edition of the movie, Peter Brunette connects the film to the existentialist tenet that actions and experiences have no meaning per se, but are given a meaning within a particular context; this is especially borne out by the disposal of the broken guitar after the rock show: "He's rescued the object, this intensely meaningful object. Yet, out of the context, it's just a broken piece of a guitar [...] the important point here being that meaning, and the construction we put on reality, is always a group social function. And it's contextual."

On the review aggregator website Rotten Tomatoes, the film holds an 87% "Certified Fresh" approval rating based on 54 reviews from film critics, with an average rating of 8.3/10. On Metacritic, the film has a weighted average score of 82 out of 100 based on reviews from 15 critics, indicating "universal acclaim."

Martin Scorsese included it on a list of "39 Essential Foreign Films for a Young Filmmaker."

Accolades

Home media
Warner Home Video released a Region 1 DVD of the film in 2004. In 2017, the Criterion Collection issued the film on Blu-ray and DVD, featuring a 4K remaster from the original camera negatives, in addition to new bonus materials.

See also 

 Blow-Up (soundtrack)
 1966 in film
 List of films featuring surveillance
 Swinging London
 BFI Top 100 British films

Endnotes
  Several people known in 1966 are in the film; others became famous later. The most widely noted cameo was by The Yardbirds who perform "Stroll On" in the last third. Michelangelo Antonioni first asked Eric Burdon to play that scene but he turned it down. In an interview Sterling Morrison of The Velvet Underground claimed that Antonioni had also asked the Velvet Underground to appear in the film, and the band were "more than willing", but due to the expense of flying the Velvets over from the US, Antonioni instead decided on an English group. As Keith Relf sings, Jimmy Page and Jeff Beck play to either side along with Chris Dreja.
  After Jeff Beck's guitar amplifier fails, he bashes his guitar to bits as The Who did at the time. Michelangelo Antonioni had wanted The Who in Blowup as he was fascinated by Pete Townshend's guitar-smashing routine.
  Steve Howe of Tomorrow recalled and wrote "We went on the set and started preparing for that guitar-smashing scene in the club. They even went as far as making up a bunch of Gibson 175 replicas and then we got dropped for The Yardbirds who were a bigger name. That's why you see Jeff Beck smashing my guitar rather than his!" Michelangelo Antonioni also considered using The Velvet Underground (signed at the time to a division of MGM Records) in the nightclub scene but according to guitarist Sterling Morrison, "the expense of bringing the whole entourage to England proved too much for him".
  Janet Street-Porter can be seen dancing in a silver coat and red and yellow striped Carnaby Street trousers during the scene inside the nightclub. A pre-Monty Python Michael Palin can also be seen in the motionless crowd watching The Yardbirds.

Footnotes

Sources
Brunette, Peter (2005). DVD Audio Commentary (Iconic Films).
Gow, Gordon. 1968. Suspense in the Cinema. Castle Books, New York. The Tanvity Press and A. S. Barnes & Co. Inc. Library of Congress Catalog Card No: 68-15196.
Hemmings, David (2004). Blow-Up… and Other Exaggerations – The Autobiography of David Hemmings. Robson Books (London). .
 Includes a translation of Cortázar's original short story.

External links 

 
 
 
 
 
 Where Did They Film That? – film entry
 Peter Bowles on making of Blow-Up
 Blowup Then & Now website
 On the set of Antonioni's Blow-Up and how this film about a '60s fashion photographer compared to the real thing.
 Blow-Up: In the Details – an essay by David Forgacs at The Criterion Collection
 Blow-Up Comprehensive collection of articles, production information, bibliography, and photo gallery, at Neugraphic.com.

1966 drama films
1966 films
1960s American films
1960s British films
1960s English-language films
1960s Italian films
1960s mystery drama films
1960s mystery thriller films
1960s psychological thriller films
1960s thriller drama films
American mystery drama films
American mystery thriller films
American psychological thriller films
American thriller drama films
British mystery drama films
British mystery thriller films
British psychological thriller films
British thriller drama films
Counterculture of the 1960s
English-language Italian films
Existentialist films
Fiction about photography
Films about fashion in the United Kingdom
Films about fashion photographers
Films based on short fiction
Films based on works by Julio Cortázar
Films directed by Michelangelo Antonioni
Films produced by Carlo Ponti
Films scored by Herbie Hancock
Films set in London
Films shot at MGM-British Studios
Films shot in London
Films with screenplays by Edward Bond
Films with screenplays by Tonino Guerra
Italian mystery drama films
Italian mystery thriller films
Italian psychological thriller films
Italian thriller drama films
Metro-Goldwyn-Mayer films
National Society of Film Critics Award for Best Film winners
Palme d'Or winners